The Logan Cup is the premier domestic first-class cricket competition in Zimbabwe. It is named after James Douglas Logan.

History
The first recorded cricket match in what was known at the time as Rhodesia was played in August 1890 near Fort Victoria. Within the next ten years, matches were played with more regularity and the most significant match was between teams representing Salisbury and Bulawayo. 

In 1903, James Douglas Logan presented Rhodesia's cricket teams with a cup to compete for, which was named the Logan Cup after him. At first-class level, Rhodesia entered a team in the South African Currie Cup in 1904–05, and then for most South African seasons from 1929–30 until 1978–79.

First-class
The Logan Cup became first-class along with Zimbabwe's elevation to Test status in 1992, and the first competition to hold first-class status was the 1993–94 Logan Cup, won by Mashonaland Under-24s. Mashonaland, essentially a representative Harare side has historically been the strongest team in the country since the late 1960s, and between 1993 and 2005 they won the tournament nine times out of twelve. The competition was not played in the 2005–06 season, due to "internal strife", both within Zimbabwean cricket, and the political set-up of the country. Upon the competition's return in 2006–07 it was relaunched with teams representing new areas, rather than the traditional provinces. Kenya were also invited to compete in the competition during 2006–07, but finished last despite showing promise.

Franchise era
The competition was again relaunched for the 2009–10 season, with five franchises: Mashonaland Eagles, Matabeleland Tuskers, Mid West Rhinos, Mountaineers and Southern Rocks. After the 2013–14 season Southern Rocks, consistently the weakest of the five teams, had their franchise suspended, leaving four teams to compete from 2014–15 to 2016–17. In 2017–18 a new academy-based team of young players, Rising Stars, brought the number of competing teams back to five. On 4 May 2020, Zimbabwe Cricket voided the 2019–20 season due to the COVID-19 pandemic with no winner being declared. The 2020–21 season saw the return of Rocks, who last played in the 2013–14 tournament. In March 2021, Rocks won their first ever Logan Cup title.

Champions
This table lists all the champions of the Logan Cup during the competition's first-class era.

References

See also
 Cricket in Zimbabwe

 
Zimbabwean domestic cricket competitions
First-class cricket competitions
Professional cricket leagues